Sabalan District is in Sareyn County, Ardabil province, Iran. At the 2006 census, its constituent villages were in Sareyn District of Ardabil County before that district rose to the status of a county. The population was 4,875 in 1,084 households. The following census in 2011 counted 5,169 people in 1,506 households, by which time it had become a district in the new Sareyn County. At the latest census in 2016, the district had 4,895 inhabitants living in 1,459 households.

Kolur, Ardabil

References 

Sareyn County

Districts of Ardabil Province

Populated places in Ardabil Province

Populated places in Sareyn County